King's peace may refer to:

 King's peace (law), also Queen's peace, a term in Anglo-Saxon law and later in English law and common law
 Peace of Antalcidas, between Ancient Greek city-states and Persia
 The King's Peace (novel), by Jo Walton, 2000

See also
 Landfrieden, under the law of the Holy Roman Empire